T. gigantea may refer to:
 Tarchia gigantea, an ankylosaurid dinosaur species from the late Cretaceous of Mongolia
 Tegenaria gigantea, the giant house spider, a spider species
 Thargelia gigantea a moth species found in Morocco, Algeria, Libya, Israel and the Sinai
 Tritonia gigantea, a marine nudibranch gastropod species
 Tyto gigantea, an extinct barn owl species from what is now Gargano, Italy, dating back to the late Miocene

Synonyms 
 Thirmida gigantea, a synonym for Scea gigantea, a moth species

See also 
 Gigantea (disambiguation)